This page lists the top all-time goalscorer for each women's national football team. This list is  an all-time top international goalscorers list, as several countries have two or more players with more goals than another country's top scorer. It simply lists only .

Since January 2020, Canadian forward Christine Sinclair is the leading all-time international goalscorer. She overtook Abby Wambach of the United States, who had held the top position for over six years. Wambach's former teammate Mia Hamm topped the list between 1999 and 2013, who was preceded by Italian player Elisabetta Vignotto.

List of top scorers by country

Players in bold are still active at international level.
Players in italics also hold the record for most caps for their nation.
Number is a count of nations.

Record progression 
Since the early 1980s there have been four players who have topped the all-time global goal scorers list.

See also
 List of men's footballers with 50 or more international goals
 List of men's footballers with 100 or more international caps
 List of women's footballers with 100 or more international goals
 List of women's footballers with 100 or more international caps

Notes

References

international
Women's nternational top scorers